There are several abbeys in Germany with the name Himmelpforten ('Gates of Heaven'):

 Himmelpforten Monastery (Harz), in Hasserode near Wernigerode
 Himmelpforten Convent, in Himmelpforten, Stade district
 Himmelpforten Abbey (Möhnesee), near Ense on the Möhnesee lake

See also
 Himmelpforten, a Lower Saxon municipality